Amédée Ferdinand René Pujol (21 August 1887 - 21 January 1942) was a French screenwriter, film director, and librettist.

Biography

Partial list of publications
1919 : L'Homme qui gagne, Éditions françaises illustrées
1928 :  S.O.S., Librairie des Champs-Élysées,  (No.27)
1929 : Le Détective bizarre, Fayard
1929 : L'Héritage de Gengis Khan, Fayard
1929 : Le Soleil noir, Lecture pour tous
1931 : La Planète invisible, Sciences et Voyages
1931 : Au Temps des brumes, Sciences et Voyages
1932 : La Chasse aux chimères, éditions des Portiques
1933 : Le Resquilleur sentimental, Tallandier
1933 : Lévy-Durand, banquier, Tallandier
1933 : Le Mystère de la flèche d'argent, Librairie contemporaine
1934 : Amédée Pifle, reporter, éditions des Portiques
1935 : La Résurrection de M. Corme, éditions de France, coll. À ne pas lire la nuit

Filmography

Director
 1931 : Everybody Wins
 1933 : 
 1934 : The Typist Gets Married
 1936 : 
 1936 : 
 1936 : Bach the Detective 
 1937 : 
 1937 : 
 1937 : Le Plus Beau Gosse de France
 1937 : La Griffe du hasard
 1937 : 
 1938 : Trois artilleurs en vadrouille
 1938 : Deux de la réserve
 1938 : 
 1938 : Ça... c'est du sport
 1938 : 
 1939 : 
 1939 : 
 1940 :  (Monsieur Bibi)

Screenwriter, dialoguist

 1927 : 600 000 francs par mois
 1930 : Le Roi des resquilleurs
 1931 : All That's Not Worth Love
 1931 : J'ai quelque chose à vous dire
 1931 : Everybody Wins
 1931 : 
 1931 : His Highness Love
 1931 :  by Pierre Colombier
 1931 :  by Léon Mathot
 1932 : Antoinette 
 1933 : 
 1933 : 
 1933 : The Two Orphans de Maurice Tourneur
 1933 : 
 1933 : Toto by Jacques Tourneur
 1933 :  by Fedor Ozep (adaptation and dialogues)
 1933 :  by Pierre Colombier
 1933 : 
 1934 : Y faut s'marier
 1934 : 
 1934 :  by Henry Wulschleger (dialogues)
 1934 : A Man Has Been Stolen
 1934 : 
 1934 : The Typist Gets Married
 1934 : 
 1934 : 
 1934 : 
 1935 : 
 1935 :  by Richard Pottier (dialogues with Jacques Prévert)
 1935 : , by Pierre-Jean Ducis
 1935 :  by Charles-Félix Tavano
 1935 : 
 1935 : 
 1935 : Monsieur Sans-Gêne
 1935 : 
 1935 :  by Jack Forrester
 1935 : Juanita
 1935 : Fanfare of Love
 1935 : 
 1936 : Marinella by Pierre Caron
 1936 : 
 1936 : 
 1936 : One Rainy Afternoon, by Rowland V. Lee
 1936 : 
 1937 : La Souris bleue
 1937 :  by Christian-Jaque (script with Jean Aurenche)
 1937 : La Griffe du hasard
 1937 : La Caserne en folie
 1937 : The Secrets of the Red Sea by Richard Pottier
 1938 : Le Plus Beau Gosse de France
 1938 : Tricoche et Cacolet
 1938 : Lights of Paris by Richard Pottier (script with Richard Liebmann)
 1938 :  by Pierre Colombier
 1939 : 
 1940 : Bécassine
 1941 : 
 1942 : 
 1942 : 
 1945 :

Composer
 1931 :  by Henry Roussel
 1931 :  by Léonce Perret
 1931 :  by Léon Mathot

Theater and operettas 
1928 : Yes by Pierre Soulaine, Albert Willemetz, Robert Bousquet, René Pujol, music Maurice Yvain, Théâtre des Capucines 
1929 : Vive Leroy , opérette by Henri Géroule and René Pujol, music Fred Pearly and Pierre Chagnon, directed by Harry Baur, Théâtre des Capucines
1929 : Minouche
1930 : Bégonia
1930 : Six filles à marier
1930 : Miami
1932 : La Pouponnière
1935 : Une nuit, 3 acts comedy by René Pujol, Théâtre Daunou
1937 : La Margoton du bataillon
1939 : Destination inconnue

References

External links

 
 René Pujol, lesgensducinema.com
 René Pujol sur le site La Comédie musicale en France
 78 films liés à René Pujol, CinéRessources.net

French crime fiction writers
French film directors
20th-century French screenwriters
20th-century French novelists
Mass media people from Bordeaux
1887 births
1942 deaths